USS Samuel Eliot Morison (FFG-13), was the seventh  in service with the United States Navy. She was named for Rear Admiral Samuel Eliot Morison (1887–1976), one of America's most distinguished naval historians, who wrote more than 40 books on naval history.

Samuel Eliot Morison was the first ship of that name in the U.S. Navy.

TCG Gökova (F 496)
On 11 April 2002, Samuel Eliot Morison was decommissioned and transferred to Turkey, where she was renamed as TCG Gökova (F 496) and joined the other Oliver Hazard Perry-class vessels acquired by the Turkish Navy as s.

In 2013 has contributed to Operation Ocean Shield with others NATO Forces Ships in the Gulf of Aden.

As of 2019, she is still in active service.

References

External links

MaritimeQuest USS Samuel Eliot Morison FFG-13 pages

Oliver Hazard Perry-class frigates of the United States Navy
1979 ships
Ships built in Bath, Maine
Ships transferred from the United States Navy to the Turkish Navy
Cold War frigates and destroyer escorts of the United States